Armata Neagră was an organized anti-Soviet group in the Moldovan SSR (Bessarabia).

Activity

Armata Neagră was formed in 1949 as an organized anti-Soviet group in Bessarabia. Teodor Coşcodan, Ion Ganea, Vasile Plaşca, Simion Alexa, Gavril Bodiu, Gheorghe Bogatu, Ion Coşcodan, Hariton Ciolpan, Pavel Caţer, Mihail Jardan, Grigore Iovu, Grigore Herţa, Maria Buruiană were important members of the clandestine organization. In July 1950, the organization had 50 active members.

Bibliography 
Elena Postică, "Armata Neagră". Organizaţie patriotică de rezistenţă sau "bandă teroristă antisovietică", Ţara, 1995, 10 ianuarie [= în Destin Românesc, 1996, 4, p. 73-84]

References

External links
Maria Buruiană – parte a Armateri Negre în lupta antisovietică

Anti-communism in Moldova
Anti-communist organizations
Clandestine groups
Moldavian Soviet Socialist Republic
Organizations disestablished in 1950
Organizations established in 1949
Ungheni District
Anti-communist resistance movements in Eastern Europe
Paramilitary organizations based in the Soviet Union